The United States competed at the 1994 Winter Olympics in Lillehammer, Norway.

Medalists 

The following U.S. competitors won medals at the games. In the by discipline sections below, medalists' names are bolded. 

| width="78%" align="left" valign="top" |

| width=22% align=left valign=top |

Competitors
The following is the list of number of competitors in the Games.

Alpine skiing

Men

Women

Biathlon

Men

Women

Bobsleigh

Cross-country skiing

Men

Women

Figure skating

Individual

Mixed

Freestyle skiing

Aerials
Men

Women

Moguls
Men

Women

Ice hockey

Summary

Team roster
 Mike Dunham
 Garth Snow
 Ted Crowley
 Brett Hauer
 Chris Imes
 Peter Laviolette (captain)
 Todd Marchant
 Matt Martin
 Travis Richards
 Barry Richter
 Mark Beaufait
 Jim Campbell
 Peter Ciavaglia
 Ted Drury
 Peter Ferraro
 Darby Hendrickson
 Craig Johnson
 Jeff Lazaro
 John Lilley
 David Roberts
 Brian Rolston
 David Sacco
 Head coach: Tim Taylor

Group play

Quarterfinal

5-8th place semifinal

Seventh place game

Luge

Men

Women

Nordic combined

Short track speed skating

Men

Women

Shana Sundstrom was an alternate of the American short track relay team.

Ski jumping

Speed skating

Men

Women

See also
United States at the 1994 Winter Paralympics

References

 Official Olympic Reports
 

Nations at the 1994 Winter Olympics
1994
Winter Olympics